Ezaz Hashmi (born 4 October 1984, in Sylhet) is a first-class and List A cricketer from Bangladesh.  He made his debut for Sylhet Division in 2002/03, playing in 35 first-class and 43 one day matches.

References

Bangladeshi cricketers
Sylhet Division cricketers
Living people
1984 births
Mohammedan Sporting Club cricketers
People from Sylhet